Breckinridge Peak is a peak in the southern group of the Rockefeller Mountains, standing  southwest of Mount Nilsen on Edward VII Peninsula. It was discovered by the Byrd Antarctic Expedition in 1929, and named by Richard E. Byrd for Colonel and Mrs. Henry Breckinridge of New York City.

References 

Mountains of King Edward VII Land